In the United States, a psychiatric-mental health nurse practitioner (PMHNP) is an advanced practice registered nurse trained to provide a wide range of mental health services to patients and families in a variety of settings. PMHNPs diagnose, conduct therapy, and prescribe medications for patients who have psychiatric disorders, medical organic brain disorders or substance abuse problems. They are licensed to provide emergency psychiatric services, psychosocial and physical assessment of their patients, treatment plans, and manage patient care. They may also serve as consultants or as educators for families and staff. The PMHNP has a focus on psychiatric diagnosis, including the differential diagnosis of medical disorders with psychiatric symptoms, and on medication treatment for psychiatric disorders.

A PMHNP is trained to practice autonomously. In 24 states, nurse practitioners (NPs) already diagnose and treat without supervision of a psychiatrist. This is in contrast to 2008, when nurse practitioners could autonomously diagnose and treat in 23 states, and could only prescribe in 12 states. In other states, PMHNPs have reduced or restricted practice, requiring a collaborative agreement with a physician expert, a standard scope of practice signed by a physician, or other limits on practice or prescribing. In these states, they still practice independently to diagnose disorders, provide therapy and prescribe medications. Titles vary by state, but usually NP, CRNP, APRN, or ARNP are commonly used.

Education 
The first step to becoming a psychiatric-mental health nurse practitioner is becoming an RN. First it is required to earn a Bachelor of Science in Nursing degree from an accredited 4-year university, or an associate degree in a nursing program. After completing the program of choice, the National Council Licensure Examination for a Registered Nurse (NCLEX-RN) is available to take. One must pass the NCLEX-RN before applying for the state licensure for an RN. After the individual passes the NCLEX-RN, the individual can then start applying to a master’s or doctoral program that is accredited by the Commission on Collegiate Nursing Education (CCNE), or the Accreditation Commission for Education in Nursing (ACEN). A Psychiatric Mental Health Nurse Practitioner degree requires two to five additional years of training. At minimum, the candidate must complete an approved Master of Science in Nursing (MSN), Post-Master's Certificate, or Doctor of Nursing Practice (DNP) advanced nursing education program. 

Individuals who already possess a bachelor's degree in another field can attend one of many accelerated BSN programs before entering an approved MSN or DNP program.  Accelerated BSN programs typically take one and a half to two years after completion of prerequisite coursework.  A new training modality is the master's entry/graduate entry to practice nursing program model, which is specifically designed for those with bachelor's degrees in non-nursing fields.  Entrants to these programs typically spend one to two years completing bachelor level nursing classes to allow them to sit for the nursing board exam NCLEX-RN, and then proceed straight into an additional 2–3 years of graduate level coursework. This is followed by clinical rotations, of at least 600 hours, to complete an MSN degree or 1000 hours for the DNP.  Students must then successfully pass a board examination to practice as a Psychiatric Mental Health Nurse Practitioner (PMHNP). PMHNP-BC is the American Nurses Credentialing Center (ANCC) designated title for a board certified Advanced Practice Psychiatric Mental Health Nurse Practitioner.

The DNP is the planned entry level degree for advanced practice registered nurses according to the ANCC. However, no state has initiated any laws regarding the DNP as the minimum degree. It is expected that current master's-prepared nurses will be "grandfathered' into the new system and as long as they keep their certification current, they will not be required to pursue a doctoral degree.

There are many schools that offer the graduate education required for this profession. Notable schools with Psychiatric-Mental Health Nurse practitioner programs are Vanderbilt University School of Nursing, Yale School of Nursing, Saint Louis University, University of California-San Francisco, University of Pennsylvania, and Columbia University School of Nursing. A listing of PMHNP programs by state can be found online at the American Nurses Credentialing Center (ANCC) and American Psychiatric Nurses Association (APNA).

The cost of education can vary greatly.  Programs at public universities are typically less expensive for state residents than out-of-state-residents.  For example, at UCSF the cost for the Masters program with in-state tuition is approximately $12,245 a year; for an out-of-state student the tuition is $24,798. In addition, programs at public universities tend to be less expensive than programs at private universities.

Characteristics 
Psychiatric-mental health nurse practitioners require certain skills to excel in the field. Being a PMHNP requires compassion for their patients and their well-being, outstanding communication skills, and a pure dedication to helping their patients heal and improve their mental state. PMHNPs also need to easily form intimate connections with their patients and have high sensitivity towards their patients' emotions, thoughts, and feelings. Attentiveness is a very important characteristic because a PMHNP needs to be able to clearly and fully listen to what their patient is saying and what their report is showing. Along with attentiveness, a PMHNP should not make any assumptions, for it may tunnel their vision when it is crucial to have an open mind with different diagnoses that may be possible. An undervalued characteristic that is vital for a PMHNP to have is optimism. The PMHNP needs to stay optimistic because it will improve the relationship with the patient and the patient's attitude about improving their health. A characteristic that all PMHNPs must have is emotional stability. Times may get stressful, but staying composed for the health and safety of both the PMHNP and the patient is consequential. a PMHNP must possess these skills for their patients best interest, as well as their own.

Practice Settings 
Psychiatric Mental Health Nurse Practitioners can choose between a variety of practice settings to work in. Some PMHNP's chose to specialize in a certain area within the field that causes them to reside in certain practice settings. Another deciding factor for where a PMHNP chooses to reside may depend on if they are following a specific Psychiatrist to improve their education. Such settings include hospitals, detoxification clinics, outpatient offices, recovery centers, correctional facilities, court hospitals, private practices, or veterans affairs hospitals.

Sub-Specialties 
Psychiatric-mental health nurse practitioners have many options as far as sub-specialties go. PMHNP's can specialize in specific areas within the field to work with a specific age of patients, a specific type of disorder, or in specific conditions. Addiction medicine is a sub-specialty that deals with the diagnosis and treatment of individuals struggling with any type of addiction, whether it be drugs, nicotine, alcohol, prescription medicine, gambling, etc. Forensics Psychiatry sub-specialty is the interconnection between mental health and criminology, where a PMHNP can anticipate to deal with individuals with mental illness in a court case or a prison. The military sub-specialty deals with the diagnosis and treatment of many military related mental health issues such as PTSD. Child and adolescent psychiatry sub-specialty deals with diagnosing and treating many behavioral mental disorders found in children such as ADHD. The geriatric psychiatry sub-specialty focuses on dealing with mental illness found in older adults in the late adulthood period. Psychosomatic medicine sub-specialty deals with the interconnections between mental illness and physical illness, such as self harm.

Disorders 
Psychiatric-mental health nurse practitioners are able to assess, diagnose, treat, and improve a wide range of mental disorders. Common mental disorders PMHNP's work with are anxiety, depression, eating disorders, trauma-related disorders, personality disorders, and ADHD. Psychiatric-mental health nurse practitioners can work on a variety of mental disorders, and they can also work on a variety of age groups with these mental disorders. PMHNP's can work with any patient from early childhood to late adulthood.

Labor Shortages 
Psychiatric-mental health nurse practitioners are in very high demand. As of 2020, throughout the United States, there were 5,766 areas with a psychiatric-mental health nurse practitioner shortage, and over 6,500 PMHNP's were needed to end this shortage. Throughout the United States, there has been a significant rise in mental health issues, and some are recently related to the COVID-19 pandemic. Throughout the pandemic, there were high reports of loneliness and financial instability that lead to symptoms of depression and anxiety. Due to this rise in mental illness throughout the United States, psychiatric-mental health practitioners are in need now more than ever.

Even before the COVID-19 pandemic, there were already rising numbers in mental health issues seen in adults and the youth in the United States. Prior to COVID-19, 19.6% of adults experienced a mental illness, and that estimates around 50 million American adults. Along with an increase in mental health issues, the rate of suicide ideation among adults has been rising, and especially peaked during the COVID-19 pandemic. Depressive episodes, severe depression, and suicide rates increased in the youth in the United States. Suicide is now the second leading cause of death in adolescents in the United States. The rate of substance abuse by American adults and adolescence has also been increasing.

With the rise of mental health issues found in adults and youth in the United States, PMHNP's are needed eagerly. Most adults and youth who deal with mental issues, do not seek help, and this is particularly because it takes weeks, or even months, before individuals can be seen by a PMHNP. There is a huge labor shortage of PMHNP's that need filled now because of the drastic increase in numbers of mental health issues in the United States.

Salary 
The salary of a PMHNP is much higher than the salary of an RN with just a BSN degree. The average median salary of a PMHNP in the United States as of 2019 was $111,840. The average hourly rate of a PMHNP in the United States as of 2019 was $53.77. The state and practice setting a PMHNP resides, as well as the number of years of experience will determine how much a PMHNP should expect to make annually. The annual salary of a PMHNP changes depending on the state of residence with California having the highest annual salary at $149,07 0 and Tennessee having the lowest annual salary at $96,510. The annual salary of a PMHNP also differs depending on the practice setting one resides in. The average annual salary of a PMHNP working in a medical hospital is $115,790. The average anuual salary of a PMHNP working in an outpatient center is $119,920. The average annual salary of a PMHNP working in a physicians office is $108,930. The average annual salary of a PMHNP working in a health practitioners office is $108,660. The average annual salary of a PMHNP working at a college or university is $105,310. The years of experience a PMHNP has will also be taken into consideration with their annual salary. A PMHNP with less than a year of experience should expect to make on average $103,000 annually. A PMHNP with one to four years of experience should expect to make on average $109,000 annually. A PMHNP with five to nine years of experience should expect to make on average $114,000 annually. A PMHNP with ten to nineteen years of experience should expect to make on average $120,000 annually.

See also 

 Psychiatric and mental health nursing
 List of counseling topics
 Mental health professional
 Mental health
 Mental illness
 Nurse Practitioner

References 

Mental health occupations
Counseling
Psychiatric nursing
Advanced practice registered nursing